The 1933–34 Luxembourg National Division was the 24th season of top level association football in Luxembourg.

Overview
It was contested by eight teams, and CA Spora Luxembourg won the championship.

League standings

Results

References
Luxembourg - List of final tables (RSSSF)

Luxembourg National Division seasons
Lux
Nat